A Parisian Affair is a short story by Guy de Maupassant, first published in French in 1881, and published in English as a collection of short stories, by Penguin Classics in 2004. It was republished by Pocket Penguins in 2016.

References

External links
 

1881 short stories
Short stories by Guy de Maupassant